Richard Carver (1792-1862) was a prolific architect of churches and secular buildings in Somerset, England, first based in his home town of Bridgwater and from 1828 in Taunton. Possibly a pupil of Sir Jeffry Wyatville, he held the post of county surveyor, from which he retired in 1857 and died at Wilton, now part of Taunton, on 1 September 1862.

Known buildings and restoration works 

The Old Schoolhouse, Yarde. A school room and teacher's house dating from 1819. for Sir John Trevelyan of Nettlecombe Court.
Church of St Philip and St James, Burtle, 1838-9.
Christ Church, Coxley, 1838-9.
St John's Church, East Horrington, 1838.
St Peter and St Paul, Over Stowey. Restoration.
Holy Trinity Church, Blackford, 1823.
 Cannington: The Blessed Virgin Mary. Church repaired and altered in 1840.
 Fitzhead: St James. Rebuilt 1849 from old materials.
 Nether Stowey: The Blessed Virgin Mary .1852-1857 Church rebuilt and enlarged.
 Stogursey: St Andrew. 1824 Restoration of the nave.
Fairfield House. Alterations, 1815.
 HM Prison Shepton Mallet in the 1830s and 1840s.
Christ Church, Theale. Datestone of 1826.
Church of St Michael, Burrowbridge, 1836-8.
Maunsell House, North Petherton, additions and alterations 1827-8.
The Guildhall, Chard, 1835
Church of the Holy Trinity, Taunton, 1842.
Church of St Philip and St James, Burtle, 1838-9.
Church of St James, Chedington, Dorset, 1840-1.
Church of St Paul, Easton, Somerset, 1843.
Willett House, Elworthy, circa 1816 and presumed design and construction of Willett Tower.

References 

History of Somerset 
People from Somerset